Mennonites in Belize form different religious bodies and come from different ethnic backgrounds. There are groups of Mennonites living in Belize who are quite traditional and conservative (e. g. in Shipyard and Upper Barton Creek), while others have modernized to various degrees (e. g. in Spanish Lookout and Blue Creek).

There were 4,961 members as of 2014, but the total number including children and young unbaptized adults was around 12,000. Of these some 10,000 were ethnic Mennonites, most of them Russian Mennonites, who speak Plautdietsch, a Low German dialect. There are also some hundreds of Pennsylvania German speaking Old Order Mennonites in Belize.

The so-called Holdeman Mennonites and the Beachy Amish are groups originally of German descent that also welcome people of other ethnic background to join their congregations.

History 

The Friesian and Flemish ancestors of the vast majority of Belizean Mennonites settled in the Vistula delta, starting in the middle of the 16th century and migrated to southern Russia between 1789 and the early 1800s, settling the Chortitza and Molotschna Mennonite colonies. During the years in Russia they became an ethnoreligious group.

In the years after 1873, some 11,000 of them left the Russian Empire and settled in Manitoba, Canada and an equal number went to the US. The more conservative ones left Canada between 1922 and 1925 and settled in Mexico. In the years after 1958, some 1,700 Mennonites from the Mexican settlements moved to what was then British Honduras.

The Russian Mennonites speak Plautdietsch in everyday life among themselves. There are also some hundred Pennsylvania German-speaking Old Order Mennonites who came from the USA and Canada in the late 1960s and settle now in Upper Barton Creek and daughter settlements.

Mennonites from El Salvador moved to Belize during their civil war.

Customs and traditions

Mennonites are easily identified by their clothing, except from the ones who have modernized to a large degree or have never been traditional, because they have converted in recent times. The women wear bonnets and long dresses while the men wear denim overalls and hats. The men may wear traditional suspenders and dark trousers. The women wear brightly colored dresses. In many of the Mennonite communities there is a softening of the old tradition. In Upper Barton Creek and daughter settlements, men and women dress similar to the Old Order Amish. Both Old Colony Mennonites and Noah Hoover Mennonites use horse-drawn buggies for transportation, but only the Noah Hoovers also till fields with horse-drawn implements.

Traditional Mennonites conduct burial services mainly in German, but with some parts in English so that visitors can take part. They use bibles like other Christians. The caskets are made of plain lumber which is lined with white cloth inside and black cloth outside. Expensive caskets are not used. A portion of the shoulder remains open during the service. After the rites the whole congregation files orderly to the front of the church to pay their last respect. In Spanish Lookout, members and friends of the deceased address the congregation after the obituary has been read. Tombs are not used, but a cross marks the name and spot. Before returning the body to the earth, hymns are sung. Members of the community take turns shoveling the earth until the burial is complete. After that the community comes together and feasts on bread, sausages and coffee with the bereaved family.

Weddings usually start with courtship, which lasts for six months to a year. The boy's parents ask the girl's father for permission. After that the parents get together and set wedding dates. The penultimate Saturday evening before the wedding is called "Falafnes". On this event, the friend of the bride and the groom share the bible reading. Weddings are performed on Sundays. They usually consist of two ministers: one to explain the meaning of matrimony, and the other to do the blessings. Gifts given are usually tools and household items.

Mennonites from the Noah Hoover group in Upper Barton Creek and daughter settlements are extremely restrictive concerning the use of motors and electricity, that is, both motors and electricity are forbidden in the settlement by the members of the group. Their clothing is very similar to the Old Order Amish, and men wear beards like the Amish. Therefore, they are often perceived as Amish and called Amish, even though this is not the case. This has caused some confusion.

The Mennonites have made it a point to have their own school, church, and financial institution in their community.

Languages
The vast majority – more than 95% – of ethnic Mennonites in Belize speak Plautdietsch in everyday life. A small minority of very conservative Mennonites that came from North America mostly in the second half of the 1960s speak Pennsylvania German instead. Both groups use Standard German for reading the Bible, in school and in Church. English and Belizean Spanish are used mainly by men for communication outside their communities, Belizean Spanish is also spoken by descendants of Mexican Mennonites and Salvadoran Mennonites. Almost all Mennonites from churches who do outreach in Belize, e. g. Beachy Amish Mennonites, speak mainly English. Mennonites from other ethnic backgrounds use their ethno-languages.

Colonies and villages

The total population of Mennonites, including unbaptized children, stood at 4,959 in 1987. The major colonies with their population in 1987 were Shipyard (1,946), Spanish Lookout (1,125) and Little Belize (1,004). Richmond Hill existed only from 1960 to 1965. Presently in Belize there are different communities of Mennonites, namely the colonies Shipyard, Blue Creek, Little Belize, Spanish Lookout, Indian Creek and the villages Upper and Lower Barton Creek, Springfield and Pine Hill. A 2020 survey found that there are more than 200 Mennonite colonies in nine Latin American countries, with 15 in Belize.

 * Bue Creek was founded by Old Colony Mennonites but in 1966 many joined EMMC and the remaining Old Colony members moved away. In 1978 members of the Kleine Gemeinde moved there.

In 1999, the Mennonites – when not counting converts from other groups – had a birth rate of 42.53 per 1000, which was well above the national average of 30.71 per 1000. Because it is not possible to establish new large colonies in Belize, Plautdietsch speaking Mennonites from Belize emigrated to several other Latin American countries but mainly to Bolivia.

There are four newer villages: Bird Walk (founded 2011) and Roseville (founded 2012), which are daughter villages from Upper Barton Creek and Springfield and Green Hills which is affiliated with the Mennonites of Pine Hill and Neuland (New Land).

Smaller outreaches of Conservative Mennonites can be found in numerous communities throughout Belize.

Mennonite Groups and membership 
As Mennonites accept only adults as members, the total population of the Mennonite congregations in Belize is underestimated by membership counts. The largest denomination was Altkolonier Mennoniten Gemeinde, with 2,052 members. Other denominations were Kleine Gemeinde zu Spanish Lookout (with 710 members) and Kleine Gemeinde zu Blue Creek (with 60 members), Iglesia Evangélica Menonita de Belice (with 400 members, mostly Mestizos), Evangelical Mennonite Mission Conference (with 388 members), Beachy Amish Mennonite Fellowship (with 140 members), Caribbean Light and Truth (with 137 members, mostly Kriol) and Church of God in Christ, Mennonite (with 42 members, mostly Kriol) (All figures as of 2006).

Economic contributions to Belize
Mennonites in Belize contribute to the carpentry, engineering and agricultural industries of Belize. They produce milk, cheese, beans, corn, melons, honey, chicken, and eggs. They have turned sections of tropical jungle into highly productive farmland. They are also skilled in manufacturing household furniture as well as constructing houses.

Controversy 
While the Mennonites in Belize have been very prosperous in agriculture, geography professor Michael Trapasso wrote, in a 1992 article published in the academic journal GeoJournal, that there have been complaints that they often do so with no regard for the environment or environmental laws. Trapasso wrote that the environmental impact of their farming methods leads to large-scale deforestation.

On the other hand, a paper of the FAO states the following about Mennonites in Belize. (Even though the report speaks of "Amish", it refers to Old Order Mennonites of the Noah Hoover group who live in settlements like Upper Barton Creek, Springfield and Pine Hill):

See also

 Belize Evangelical Mennonite Church
 Demographics of Belize

References

Inline citations

Sources referenced
 Carel Roessingh and Tanja Plasil (Editors): Between Horse & Buggy and Four-Wheel Drive: Change and Diversity Among Mennonite Settlements in Belize, Central America, Amsterdam 2009.
 Dale J. Nippert: Agricultural Colonization: The Mennonites of Upper Barton Creek, Belize. Memphis 1994.
 Gerhard S. Koop: Pioneer years in Belize, Belize City 1991.

External links
 "A Simple Life", photo-essay on Mennonites in Belize, from New York Times, September 15, 2018.
 "Data for "Pious Pioneers: The expansion of Mennonite colonies in Latin America"", This data is provided in support of the paper "Pious Pioneers: The expansion of Mennonite colonies in Latin America", published in the Journal of Land Use Science, December 15, 2020, 1–17 

Ethnic groups in Belize
European Belizean
German diaspora in North America